Northern queen or variation may refer to:

Horses
 Northern Queen (foaled 1962), a Canadian racehorse
 Northern Queen (foaled 1974), an Irish racehorse; granddam of Prize Lady
 Northern Queen, an Australian racehorse; see Australian Champion Racehorse of the Year

Ships and boats
  SS Northern Queen, a steamer built in 1889 and sunk in 1913; 
  Northern Queen, a British ship that sank in 1856

Fictional ships and boats
 Northern Queen, a fictional houseboat from Mandy (comics)

See also

 "Northern Queen of Soul", singer Gloria Jones
 Northern (disambiguation)
 Queen (disambiguation)
 North queen (disambiguation)
 Queen of the North (disambiguation)